Bombus coccineus, also known by its common name scarlet-tailed bumble bee, is a species from the subgenus Cullumanobombus.  The species was first described in 1903.

References

Bumblebees
Insects described in 1903